Empath is the eighteenth studio album by Canadian metal musician Devin Townsend, released on his own label HevyDevy Records on March 29, 2019. It is his first solo album since Dark Matters, which was a part of the 2014 double album Z², and his first release to act solely as a solo album since 2007's Ziltoid the Omniscient.

Production 
On January 31, 2018, Townsend announced on his Facebook page that he was taking a break from the Devin Townsend Project, which had been his main project since 2008. This would make Empath Townsend's first release to act solely as a solo album since 2007's Ziltoid the Omniscient. The Empath project was first mentioned in a tweet from January 1, 2017, and officially announced two years later, along with its release date, on January 15, 2019, when work on the album had already been completed.

A statement on his official Facebook page stated about the origins of the album:

It was also described as "A bold statement with massive production values and dynamic, uncompromised musicality. This is a statement about not only pursuing creative freedom in a conservative scene, but also trying to show that heavy music is truly a valid musical tool." Guest performers include former Frank Zappa collaborators Mike Keneally, Morgan Ågren and Steve Vai, as well as Samus Paulicelli from Decrepit Birth, Anup Sastry, Chad Kroeger, Townsend's regular collaborator Anneke van Giersbergen, Ché Aimee Dorval (who had worked with Townsend on Casualties of Cool), Elliot Desgagnés from Beneath the Massacre, and Ryan Dahle.

A series of documentary videos detailing the making of Empath has been released on YouTube.

On February 22, 2019, the first single from the album, "Genesis", was released. A corresponding video was also debuted that complemented the song's intricate style. On March 15, 2019, a second single titled "Evermore" was released; an accompanying music video was made for the single, which features a 2D animated cat flying through space.

Release 
Empath was released on March 29, 2019. Editions include a limited 2-CD digipak with a disc of bonus material, a gatefold 180g 2-LP vinyl + CD + LP booklet edition.

Critical response 
Wall of Sound gave the album a perfect score of 10/10, writing: "Devin's need for deeper creative expression has resulted in one of the year's most memorable works".

Angry Metal Guy contributor GardensTale gave Empath a score of 4.0/5.0, calling it "...the most Devin album Devin ever recorded."

Loudwire named it one of the 50 best metal albums of 2019.

Track listing

Personnel
 Devin Townsend – lead vocals, guitars, bass, keyboards, programming, production
 Nathan Navarro – bass ("Genesis", "Evermore", "Why?", "Borderlands")
 Morgan Ågren – drums ("Genesis", "Sprite", "Why?", "Borderlands", "Curious Gods", "Empath", "Summer")
 Samus "66Samus" Paulicelli – drums ("Genesis", "Hear Me", "There Be Monsters", "Gulag", "Middle Aged Man", "Total Collapse")
 Anup Sastry – drums ("Genesis", "Spirits Will Collide", "Evermore", "Borderlands", "I Am I", "Silicon Scientists", "Here Comes the Sun!", "King", "The Waiting Kind", "Singularity")
 Elliot Desgagnés – additional death metal vocals ("Genesis", "Spirits Will Collide", "Evermore", "Sprite", "Why?", "There Be Monsters") 
 Ché Aimee Dorval – additional vocals ("Genesis")
 Anneke van Giersbergen – additional vocals ("Hear Me", "Here Comes the Sun!", "King")
 Chad Kroeger – additional vocals ("Hear Me")
 Josefa Torres - additional vocals ("Sprite")
 Ron Getgood - additional vocals (spoken intro on "Sprite")
 Reyne Townsend - additional vocals
 Ryan Dahle – additional guitars ("Borderlands")
 Steve Vai – additional guitars ("Here Comes the Sun!")
 Shaun Verreault - pedal steel
 Elektra Women's Choir – choir
 Callum Marinho - whistles
 Mike Keneally – additional guitars, keyboards, co-production
 Adam "Nolly" Getgood – producer, engineering

Charts

References

Devin Townsend albums
2019 albums
Albums produced by Devin Townsend